The 2022 Jabal al-Bishrī clashes were a set of clashes that took place in the Jabal al-Bishrī highland area on the border of the Deir ez-Zor Governorate, Raqqa Governorate and Homs Governorates between forces of the Syrian Government and the Islamic State.

The attacks came after the SOHR reported on a large grouping of Islamic State fighters in the Palmyra desert on 9 June.

The clashes 
On 20 June, 11 Syrian government soldiers and two bus drivers were killed in an ambush by ISIS militants, targeting Syrian Army buses transporting soldiers on the highway in the Al-Jira area.

On 21 June, three Syrian government soldiers were killed and three others were injured after IS fighters attacked a temporary military outpost in the Jabal Al-Bishri desert on the administrative boundary between Raqqa and Deir az-Zour provinces in northeastern Syria under the cover of a sandstorm.

On 22 June, late in the day, clashes began between government and IS forces in the Jabal Al-Bishri desert, following aerial bombardment in the area by Russian warplanes, targeting IS positions. These clashes continued into the next day, leaving at least 9 Syrian soldiers and 7 IS fighters dead.

On 24 June, in response to the clashes, Syrian government forces launched large-scale combing operations in the area to find and eliminate IS cells in the region.

References 

2022 in the Syrian civil war
June 2022 events in Asia
Conflicts in 2022
Battles in 2022